Salix arctica, the Arctic willow, is a tiny creeping willow (family Salicaceae). It is adapted to survive in Arctic conditions, specifically tundras.

Description
Like the rest of the willows, Arctic willow is dioecious, with male and female catkins on separate plants. As a result, the plant's appearance varies; the female catkins are red-coloured, while the male catkins are yellow-coloured.

Despite its small size, it is a long-lived plant, growing extremely slowly in the severe arctic climate; one in eastern Greenland was found to be 236 years old.

Hybrids with Salix arcticola and Salix glauca are known.

Distribution and habitat
The Arctic willow grows in tundra and rocky moorland, and is the northernmost woody plant in the world, occurring far above the tree line to the northern limit of land on the north coast of Greenland. Its distribution is circumpolar. It occurs in Canada in the mainland northern territories and in the Arctic Archipelago all the way up to Ellesmere Island alongside Greenland, and in northern Quebec and Labrador, as well as in northern Iceland, Fenno-Scandinavia, northern Russia and northern Alaska.

It also occurs further south in North America on high-altitude alpine tundra, south to the Sierra Nevada in California and the Rocky Mountains in New Mexico. It also occurs in Xinjiang, China.

Ecology
The Arctic willow is a food source for several Arctic animals. Muskoxen, caribou, Arctic hares, and lemmings all feed on the bark and twigs, while the buds are the main food source of the rock ptarmigan.

It is the primary host plant and food source for the Arctic woolly bear moth (Gynaephora groenlandica).

Uses
Both the Inuit and the Gwich’in make use of this willow. Twigs are used as fuel, while the decayed flowers (suputiit) are mixed with moss and used as wicking in the kudlik. The plant was used for several medicinal purposes, such as relieving toothache, helping to stop bleeding, curing diarrhoea and indigestion, and as a poultice on wounds.

Both the Gwich’in and Inuit in the Bathurst Inlet area were known to eat parts of the plant, which is high in vitamin C and tastes sweet. One young leaf contains 7 to 10 times more vitamin C than an orange. The inside of the young shoots (excluding the bark) can be eaten raw, including those found underground.

References

External links

Jepson Manual treatment – Salix arctica

arctica
Flora of the Arctic
Alpine flora
Flora of Greenland
Flora of Norway
Flora of Sweden
Flora of the Faroe Islands
Flora of Iceland
Flora of Russia
Flora of Siberia
Flora of Alaska
Flora of Canada
Flora of the Northwestern United States
Flora of California
Flora of the Sierra Nevada (United States)
Flora of New Mexico
Flora of Japan
Flora of China
Flora without expected TNC conservation status